The National Institute of Dramatic Art (NIDA) is an Australian educational institution for the performing arts is based in Sydney, New South Wales. Founded in 1958, many of Australia's leading actors and directors trained at NIDA, including Cate Blanchett, Mel Gibson, Judy Davis and Baz Luhrmann.

NIDA's main campus is based in the Sydney suburb of Kensington, located adjacent to the University of New South Wales (UNSW), and is made up of a range of rehearsal and performance venues. Its performance venues include the Parade Theatre (also the name of an earlier venue in NIDA's history); the Space; the Studio Theatre; and the Playhouse, while the Rodney Seaborn Library forms part of its library and the Reg Grundy Studio is a training and production facility for film and television. 

NIDA offers bachelor's, master's and vocational degrees in subjects including acting, writing, directing, scenic construction, technical theatre, voice, costume, props, production design and cultural leadership.

History

NIDA was founded in 1958 as the first professional theatre training school in Australia. The idea of a national theatre training school was initiated by the Australian Elizabethan Theatre Trust (AETT) in 1954. With the support of the Vice-Chancellor (later Sir) Philip Baxter, NIDA was established in the grounds of the University of New South Wales. Robert Quentin, later Professor of Drama at UNSW, was appointed the inaugural Director.

Teaching began in 1959 and in 1960, the first 23 students graduated with a Diploma in Acting. After 1961 it offered both acting and production streams, and in the early 1970s design, technical production and directing streams were introduced.

NIDA ran the Old Tote Theatre Company until 1969, whose productions were initially funded by the AETT and subsequently by the Australia Council for the Arts and the New South Wales Government. In 1967 the Old Tote moved its administration to separate premises, to a building which still exists on the UNSW campus, then known as the Parade Theatre, and on 7 May 1969 gave its first performance at that venue, a production of Tom Stoppard's Rosencrantz and Guildenstern Are Dead.

The present campus was first opened in 1987.

In 1991 NIDA expanded into the study of theatrical crafts – costume, properties, scenery and staging – and over the 2000s developed post-graduate courses in voice, movement studies, production management and playwriting.

Additional buildings opened in 2001, which were awarded the 2002 Sir John Sulman Medal for public architecture.

Governance and funding
NIDA receives funding from the Australian Government through the Department of Communications and the Arts, and is a member of the "Australian Roundtable for Arts Training Excellence" (ARTS8), an initiative between the national performing arts training organisations and the federal government that provides training for emerging artists.

Admission
Entry to NIDA's Bachelor of Fine Arts, Master of Fine Arts and Vocational courses is highly competitive with an admission rate of around 12% and even lower for some courses; with more than 1,500 applicants from around the country competing for an annual offering of approximately 185 places across the six undergraduate, five post-graduate and four vocational diploma disciplines.

NIDA's Bachelor of Fine Arts in Acting is particularly competitive, with approximately 1,000 applicants per year attempting to secure one of 24 spots in the program.

Campus
NIDA is located on Anzac Parade in the Sydney suburb of Kensington, across the road from the University of New South Wales.

Theatres
 NIDA campus has six professional performance venues, in addition to studios and rehearsal rooms. The largest of these, the Parade Theatre, has three-tiered seating which accommodates up to 707 people. Other venues include the Playhouse, the Space, and the Studio Theatre.

Library and archives
The Rodney Seaborn Library, named in honour of arts philanthropist Rodney Seaborn  (1912–2008), is a specialist library for NIDA students, graduates and staff and is also open to the general public by appointment. It was created in 1980.

The NIDA Archives collects, organises and preserves archival records created by or relating to NIDA.

Other facilities
The NIDA campus includes rehearsal rooms, multi-media and computer-aided design (CAD) studios, a sound stage, a lighting studio, production workshops, audio-visual facilities, and the Reg Grundy Studio film and television training and production facility.

Ranking
In 2018, NIDA was ranked as the 10th best drama school in the world by The Hollywood Reporter It is consistently ranked as the top school in Australia, or in the top five, by many sources. In 2021, it was reported as the 16th best drama school in the world by the same source, making it the only Australian drama school to make the list.

Alumni 

The National Institute of Dramatic Art (NIDA) is Australia's leading centre for education and training in the performing arts. A complete list of NIDA alumni can be found on the NIDA website.

Many of NIDA's prominent alumni were featured in a photo essay in The Sydney Morning Herald in celebration of the school's 60th anniversary in 2019.

Graduates from the National Institute of Dramatic Art include:

Acting

Cate Blanchett AC
Grant Bowler
Tom Burlinson
Nathin Butler
Rob Collins
Timothy Conigrave
Ryan Corr
Essie Davis
Judy Davis
Andrea Demetriades
Eamon Farren
Lewis Fitz-Gerald
Colin Friels
Mel Gibson
Harry Greenwood
Remy Hii
Matthew Le Nevez
Glenda Linscott
Baz Luhrmann
Jessica Marais
Catherine McClements
Garry McDonald AO
Jacqueline McKenzie
Heather Mitchell
Michelle Vergara Moore
Toby Leonard Moore
Robyn Nevin AM
Matthew Newton
Bojana Novakovic
Zindzi Okenyo
Miranda Otto
Susie Porter
Philip Quast
Richard Roxburgh
Alex Russell
Toby Schmitz
Shari Sebbens
Hugh Sheridan
Sarah Snook
Yael Stone
Miranda Tapsell
Anna Torv
Hugo Weaving
John Wood
Sam Worthington
Meyne Wyatt
Gareth Yuen

Design

Alice Babidge
Kym Barrett
Theodore Benton
Adrian Britnell
Fiona Crombie, 2019 Academy Award nominee for The Favourite
Peter England
Dale Ferguson
Dane Laffrey
Catherine Martin
Ralph Myers, Former Artistic Director Belvoir St Theatre
Jacob Nash, Head of Design for Bangarra Dance Theatre
Deborah Riley, Emmy Award-winning production designer of Game of Thrones
Gypsy Taylor
Gabriela Tylesova
Michael Wilkinson, 2014 Academy Award Nominee for American Hustle

Directing

Jessica Arthur
Paul Curran
Gale Edwards
Sarah Giles
Jennifer Kent
Lee Lewis
Greg McLean
Jonathan Messer
Tommy Murphy
Moffatt Oxenbould
Marion Potts
Kip Williams, artistic director of Sydney Theatre Company

Production
 Kuo Pao Kun
 Garry McQuinn, co-founder of RGM Productions
Sally Riley, Head of Scripted Production for the Australian Broadcasting Company
 Jim Sharman, Director of The Rocky Horror Picture Show

Scenic construction 
 Boaz Shemesh, Head of Set Construction for Sydney Theatre Company

Writing 
 Jackie McKimmie
 Alana Valentine

Awards 
NIDA alumni have won close to 1,000 awards including 8 Academy Awards, 8 Golden Globes, 9 Emmys, 48 Logies, 18 BAFTAs, 5 Oliviers, 3 Tonys and more.
Academy Awards
Catherine Martin (Design, 1988): 2014 Winner Best Achievement in Costume Design The Great Gatsby; 2014 Winner Best Production Design, The Great Gatsby; 2002 Winner Best Art Direction-Set Decoration, Moulin Rouge!; 2002 winner Best Costume Design, Moulin Rouge!
Cate Blanchett (Acting, 1992): 2014 Winner Best Performance by an Actress in a Leading Role, Blue Jasmine; 2005 Winner Best Performance by an Actress in a Supporting Role, The Aviator
Mel Gibson (Acting, 1977): 1996 Winner Best Picture, Braveheart; 1996 Winner Best Director, Braveheart

BAFTA Awards
Catherine Martin (Design, 1988): 2014 Winner Best Costume Design, The Great Gatsby; 2014 Best Production Design, The Great Gatsby; 1998 Winner Best Production Design, Romeo + Juliet; 1993 Winner Best Costume Design, Strictly Ballroom; 1993 Winner Best Production Design, Strictly Ballroom
Cate Blanchett (Acting, 1992): 2018 Winner, Stanley Kubrick Britannia Award for Excellence in Film; 2014 Winner, Best Leading Actress, Blue Jasmine; 2005 Winner, Best Performance by an Actress in a Supporting Role, The Aviator; 1999 Winner, Best Performance by an Actress in a Leading Role, Elizabeth
Baz Luhrmann (Acting, 1985): 1998 Winner Best Direction, Romeo + Juliet; 1998 Winner Best Adapted Screenplay, Romeo + Juliet
Judy Davis (Acting, 1977): 1981 Winner Best Actress, My Brilliant Career; 1981 Winner Most Outstanding Newcomer to Leading Film Roles, My Brilliant Career
Deborah Riley (Design, 1996): 2018 Winner Production Design, Game of Thrones
Fiona Crombie (Design, 1998): 2019 Winner Best Production Design, The Favourite
Craig Pearce (Acting, 1984): 1998 Winner Best Adapted Screenplay for Romeo + Juliet
Angus Strathie (Design, 1988): 1993 Winner Best Costume Design, Strictly Ballroom

Golden Globe Awards
Cate Blanchett (Acting, 1992): 2014 Winner Best Performance by an Actress in a Motion Picture – Drama, Blue Jasmine'; 2008 Winner Best Performance by an Actress in a Supporting Role in a Motion Picture, I’m Not There; 1999 Winner Best Performance by an Actress in a Motion Picture – Drama, ElizabethJudy Davis (Acting, 1977): 2002 Winner Best Performance by an Actress in a Miniseries or a Motion Picture Made for Television, Life with Judy Garland: Me and My Shadows; 1992 Winner Best Performance by an Actress in A Mini-series or Motion Picture for TV, One Against the Wind''
Mel Gibson (Acting, 1977): 1996 Winner Best Director – Motion Picture, Braveheart

Primetime Emmy Awards
Deborah Riley (Design, 1996): 2018 Winner Outstanding Production Design for a Narrative Period or Fantasy Program (One Hour or More), Game of Thrones for episode ‘Dragonstone’; 2016 Winner Outstanding Production Design for a Narrative Period or Fantasy Program (One Hour or More), Game of Thrones for episodes ‘Blood of My Blood’, ‘The Broken Man’ and ‘No One’; 2015 Winner Outstanding Production Design for a Narrative Period or Fantasy Program (One Hour or More), Game of Thrones For episodes: ‘High Sparrow’, ‘Unbowed’, ‘Unbent’, ‘Unbroken’ and ‘Hardhome’; 2014 Winner Outstanding Art Direction for a Contemporary or Fantasy Series (Single-Camera), Game of Thrones for episodes ‘The Laws of God and Men’ and ‘The Mountain and the Viper’
Judy Davis (Acting, 1977): 2007 Winner Outstanding Supporting Actress in a Miniseries or Movie, The Starter Wife; 2001 Winner Outstanding Lead Actress in a Miniseries or a Movie, Life with Judy Garland: Me and My Shadows; 2001 Winner Outstanding Makeup – Miniseries, Movie, Special, Life with Judy Garland: Me and My Shadows; 1995 Winner Outstanding Supporting Actress in a Miniseries or a Special, Serving in Silence: The Margarethe Cammermeyer Story

Learning by doing 
Industry engagement and collaborative student learning are core part of NIDA courses. NIDA utilises a conservatoire model, where students learn by practical application through in-house productions and working with professional companies on short-term placements. In addition to classwork, students will work on multiple practical projects during their time at NIDA, ranging from full theatrical productions to short films. Depending on the program, students may also undertake interstate and international trips as part of the learning process.

Short courses 
NIDA delivers hundreds of short courses every year across Australia and internationally through NIDA Open and NIDA Corporate.

NIDA Open 
NIDA Open is Australia's largest non-profit, performing arts short course program. In 2018, more than 15,000 students attended NIDA Open courses in Sydney, Melbourne, Brisbane, Adelaide, Perth, Canberra, Darwin and other locations. NIDA Open offers courses for children and young people from preschool through Grade 12, as well as adult courses, in acting, comedy, costumes, props, make-up, design, directing, filmmaking, musical theatre, physical theatre and movement, presenting, technical theatre, stage management, voice and writing.

NIDA Corporate 
NIDA Corporate offers training in professional communication, presentation and leadership for individuals and businesses in the public and private sectors. Tutors include voice specialists, movement and body language practitioners, film and theatre directors, actors and television presenters. In 2018, more than 9,000 participants attended NIDA Corporate training.

Controversy
In 2012, former NIDA board member and Liberal senator Chris Puplick, who had served on the board for three years, wrote an essay titled "Changing Times at NIDA" which was published in the October issue of the publication Platform Papers. In the essay, Puplick criticized the teaching standards of the school and its director and chief executive, Lynne Williams, stating that she has had no significant experience in theatre to head the school and that her style was "Thatcherite". Soon after Puplick's statements were reported, chairman of NIDA's board, Malcolm Long, and Lynne Williams replied back to the comments, with Long stating that Williams had the complete support of the board and described Puplick as "an apparently disaffected former board member." Williams had defended herself stating her management style was not "Thatcherite". Long also mentioned that amongst Williams' supporters were Cate Blanchett and Ralph Myers. Supporting Puplick were actor, director and a graduate of the school Jeremy Sims, who had launched the essay, and Kevin Jackson, who had taught acting at the school for 27 years.

In June 2020, a letter from over 100 alumni, students and former staff was signed and sent to NIDA's chief executive Liz Hughes accusing the school for failing to support Indigenous, Black and other students of colors. The letter which was sent to Hughes via email accused the school of "systemic and institutionalised racism" and where students had felt that they were there simply to fulfill diversity quotas.

References

External links

Australian tertiary institutions
Drama schools in Australia
Education in Sydney
Educational institutions established in 1958
Film schools in Australia
Theatres in Sydney
1958 establishments in Australia
Buildings and structures awarded the Sir John Sulman Medal
Kensington, New South Wales